Mercy Hospital, located in Coon Rapids, Minnesota, is a 471-bed non-profit hospital that serves the northern Twin Cities metropolitan area. Mercy Hospital is a part of Allina Health. Mercy offers specialty services including behavioral health, cancer care, heart and vascular services, orthopedics and neuroscience.

History
Mercy Hospital was first opened on March 17, 1965.  There is also a Unity campus of Mercy Hospital.

Take Heart Anoka County
Mercy Hospital is the main sponsor of Take Heart Anoka County, a coalition of doctors, nurses, paramedics, health educators and community leaders that aims to dramatically increase the likelihood of survival after sudden cardiac arrest by training more people in cardiopulmonary resuscitation (CPR) and placing automated external defibrillators (AEDs) in public places throughout the community. This aggressive approach to promote cardiac arrest and CPR awareness is also being followed in St. Cloud, Minnesota; Columbus, Ohio and Austin, Texas.

References

External links

Hospitals in Minnesota
Hospitals established in 1965